Yasmina, a Black Woman is a jazz album by Archie Shepp, recorded in 1969 in Paris for BYG Actuel. It features musicians from the Art Ensemble of Chicago. The first track, giving its title to the album, is a long free jazz piece by an 11-piece orchestra; in it, the references to Africa that Shepp had experimented with only a few weeks earlier in Algiers are to be found in the use of African percussion instruments, or the African incantations sung by Shepp himself at the beginning of the track. The other two pieces, a homage to Sonny Rollins written by trombonist Grachan Moncur III and a standard, played by a more traditional quintet and quartet respectively, are more reminiscent of the hard bop genre, although the fiery playing of the musicians, notably Shepp himself, gives them a definite avant-garde edge. It was originally issued on CD by Affinity (paired with Poem for Malcolm), mastered from an incredibly noisy vinyl source and later reissued by Charly (also paired with Poem for Malcolm) from the original master tapes.

Track listing

 "Yasmina, a Black Woman" (A. Shepp) – 20:08
 "Sonny's Back" (G. Moncur) – 14:03
 "Body and Soul" (Heyman, Sour, Green) – 6:23
Recorded: Paris, August 12, 1969.

Personnel

On "Yasmina, a Black Woman"

 Archie Shepp – tenor saxophone, vocal
 Clifford Thornton – cornet
 Lester Bowie – trumpet
 Arthur Jones – alto saxophone
 Roscoe Mitchell – bass saxophone, piccolo
 Dave Burrell – piano
 Malachi Favors, Earl Freeman – bass
 Sunny Murray – drums, percussions
 Art Taylor – rhythm logs
 Laurence Devereaux – balafon

On "Sonny's Back"

 Archie Shepp, Sonny Rollins – tenor saxophone, vocal
 Dave Burrell – piano
 Malachi Favors – bass
 Philly Joe Jones – drums

On "Body and Soul"

 Archie Shepp – tenor saxophone, vocal
 Dave Burrell – piano
 Malachi Favors – bass
 Philly Joe Jones – drums

References

1969 albums
Archie Shepp albums
BYG Actuel albums
Free jazz albums